John Harmon (June 30, 1905 – August 6, 1985) was an American character actor.

Harmon was a very prolific bit actor. His career spanned over six decades and almost 300 movie and television roles in a wide variety of genres. Many of his earlier appearances are uncredited. His first major screen credit was in I Was Framed (1942). His movie career highlights were roles in Gallant Bess, The Monster of Piedras Blancas, Live Fast, Die Young and The Street is my Beat. The movie in which he made his last screen appearance, The Naked Monster, was released in 2005, twenty years after his death. Harmon's most notable TV roles were in Bonanza, The Twilight Zone, Perry Mason (as a police fingerprint/ballistics expert), Star Trek (in the episodes "The City on the Edge of Forever" and "A Piece of The Action"), The Rifleman (as the hotel clerk Eddie Halstead) and again as a hotel clerk in Gunsmoke (in S1E15's “Gold Mine”). He also made several appearances as various criminals in Adventures of Superman.

In his later years, Harmon became a used books dealer in Los Angeles. He collected first editions of Mark Twain. He suffered a stroke about a year before he died from heart failure.

Selected filmography

 The Missing Guest (1938)
 King of the Underworld (1939) as Slats
 The Shepherd of the Hills (1941) as revenue agent
 I Was Framed (1942)
 Tramp, Tramp, Tramp (1942)
 Find the Blackmailer (1943)
 Louisiana (1947)
 Monsieur Verdoux (1947) as Joe Darwin
 Whiplash (1948) as fighter Kid McKee
 Homicide (1949) as Pete Kimmel
 Tangier Incident (1953)
 Run for the Hills (1953)
 Jack Slade (1953)
 Funny Girl (1968) as Company Manager
 Hitch Hike to Hell (1977) as Mr. Baldwin
 Malibu High'' (1979)

References

External links 

 

American male film actors
American male television actors
Male actors from Washington, D.C.
1905 births
1985 deaths
20th-century American male actors